Yalies are persons affiliated with Yale University, commonly including alumni, current and former faculty members, students, and others. Here follows a list of notable Yalies.

Alumni 

For a list of notable alumni of Yale Law School, see List of Yale Law School alumni.

Prize recipients

Nobel laureates

Pulitzer Prize winners

Architecture and visual arts

Arts and humanities

Athletics

Business

College founders and presidents

Film

Inventors and innovators

Life sciences and medicine

Mathematics and computer science

Physical sciences and engineering

Law and politics

Presidents and vice presidents, royalty, other heads of state, prime ministers and ministers

Supreme Court justices 

Information can be verified through the Biographical Directory of Federal Judges.

U.S. Senators 

Information can be verified at the Biographical Directory of the U.S. Congress.

Other legislators

Governors, other state officials and mayors 

Alumni who have served as governors may also have served in other government capacities, such as president or senator. In such cases, the names are left un-linked, but are annotated with a "See also:" which links to the section on this page where a more detailed entry can be found.

Cabinet members, chairpersons/administrators and advisers 

The following have worked within the cabinet for their respective governments.

Diplomats

Judges and attorneys

Activists

Political commentators

Other 

 Matthew Adler (B.A. 1984 and J.D. 1991), law professor
 Algernon Sydney Biddle (1847–1891), lawyer and law professor at the University of Pennsylvania Law School
 Moses Cleaveland (B.A. 1777), founder of Cleveland, Ohio
 Manasseh Cutler (B.A. 1765), co-author of the Northwest Ordinance of 1787, member of the Ohio Company of Associates (the first non-Native American settlement in Ohio), congressman (F-Massachusetts) (1801–05)
 James Gadsden (B.A. 1806), namesake of the Gadsden Purchase, in which the United States purchased from Mexico the land that became parts of Arizona and New Mexico
 Clarence King (Ph.D. 1862), founder of the U.S. Geological Survey
 James Wadsworth (1787), founder of Geneseo, New York, and leading pioneer and community leader of the Genesee Valley
 Amy Wax (B.S. 1975), Robert Mundheim Professor of Law at the University of Pennsylvania Law School

Military

Religion

History, literature, and journalism

Musicians and composers

Faculty 

Professors who are also Yale alumni are listed in italics.

Nobel laureates

Social sciences

Technologists

Television

Theatre

Others

Arts and humanities

Life sciences and medicine

Mathematics

Physical sciences and engineering

Social sciences

Heads of Collegiate School, Yale College, and Yale University

See also 
 Yale Corporation – including a list of corporation members

References 

Lists of people by university or college in Connecticut
 
People